İbrahim Şevki Atasagun (1899, Istanbul, Ottoman Empire – May 28, 1984, Ankara, Turkey) was a Turkish soldier and statesman. In 1966, he served as acting  president of the republic for 55 days while President Cemal Gürsel underwent medical treatments in the United States.

Career
He graduated from Istanbul Darulfünûn Medical School, where he entered as a military student. He participated in the Turkish War of Independence on the Western front with the rank of medical lieutenant and won the Medal of Independence (İstiklâl Madalyası) by rising to first lieutenant. He was appointed to the Military Medical School (Gülhane Academy) as a negotiator physician. He completed his internal medicine specialist training in 1926. When he passed the Medical Faculty Hygiene Associate Professorship exam, which he entered on leave from the General Staff, he was considered on leave for five years, without prejudice to his connection with the army. He was appointed to Erzurum Military Hospital (Marshal Çakmak Military Hospital) on October 3, 1933. He became a major in 1934. After the Tekirdağ Military Hospital, he was assigned to the Siirt Military Hospital. He served in the Eastern service after his appointment as a lieutenant colonel in 1941. He was transferred to Ankara Military School Chief Physician. He was appointed as the 2nd Medical Doctor of the Military Position Hospital. He worked in the General Staff Health Department. He was appointed as a hygiene professor at Gülhane Military Medical Academy. Brigadier general in 1953, and promoted to major general in 1956. He was appointed as the Head of the Land Forces Department of Health. He retired on September 21, 1957. Between 1958 and 1960 he served as the Undersecretary of the Ministry of Health.

In the election held on October 15, 1961, he was elected as a member of the Republican Senate Nevşehir as the candidate of the Republican Villagers Nation Party. He was re-elected in the one-third renewal election on June 2, 1968, and he continued this post until the renewal elections on June 5, 1977. He served as the Head of the National Defense Commission in 1963 and 1964. He left his party between June 4, 1962 and February 7, 1963 and remained independent. After a while he returned to his party, but left again on February 25, 1964 and joined the Justice Party on April 9, 1964. He became the Vice President in the first election of the Presidential Board of the Senate of the Republic held on October 28, 1961. He held this post until the election on November 2, 1962. He was elected as the President of the Senate of the Republic on December 2, 1965 and he continued this duty until November 9, 1970.

He acted as President of the Republic between February 2 and March 28, 1966, when President Cemal Gürsel was in treatment in the United States. He chaired the Senate Delegations, which officially visited Berlin, Poland, Czechoslovakia, Iran, Pakistan and Hungary at the invitation of the Parliament Presidents.

External links 
Turkey's Health Ministry official website - the undersecretary list
Şevki Atasagun - Parliament session records
Şevki Atasagun biography

|-

|-

1899 births
1984 deaths
20th-century presidents of Turkey
Politicians from Istanbul
Acting presidents of Turkey
Turkish Military Academy alumni
Army War College (Turkey) alumni
Turkish Army officers
Members of the Senate of the Republic (Turkey)
Academic staff of the Turkish Military Academy
Military personnel from Istanbul